The men's 1500 metres event at the 2003 Summer Universiade was held in Daegu, South Korea on 26–28 August.

Medalists

Results

Heats

Final

References
Results
Heat 1 results

Athletics at the 2003 Summer Universiade
2003